Ghanashyam Bhusal( born on September 11, 1961) in Pidikhola, Syangja district, is a Nepalese Politician and serving as the Member Of House Of Representatives (Nepal) elected from Rupandehi 3 constituency of Lumbini province. Bhusal is a general secretary of CPN (Unified Socialist).  

He is the former Minister at Ministry of Agricultural and Livestock Development (Nepal). Bhusal has also served as a minister of 'Office of the Prime minister and council of ministers' under former minister Jhala Nath Khanal.

Early life and start of political career
Ghanashyam Bhusal was born as third child to Jhabisara Bhusal and Jagganath Bhusal on September 11, 1961 in Pidikhola, Syangja District. His family later shifted to Rupandehi district where he started his political life as a student leader. He was General-Secretary of All Nepal National Free Students Union ANNFSU, the student wing of the Nepal Communist Party.

References

1961 births
Living people
Nepal MPs 2017–2022
Nepal Communist Party (NCP) politicians
Nepal MPs 1994–1999
People from Syangja District
Communist Party of Nepal (Unified Marxist–Leninist) politicians
Communist Party of Nepal (Unified Socialist) politicians